"Different Drum" is a song written by American singer-songwriter Michael Nesmith in 1964. It was first recorded by the northern bluegrass band The Greenbriar Boys and included on their 1966 album Better Late than Never! Nesmith offered it to the Monkees, but the producers of the TV show, who had wide control over the group's musical output early on, turned him down (though Nesmith did perform a short comic version of the song in an episode of The Monkees).

The song became popular in 1967 when it was recorded by the Stone Poneys featuring Linda Ronstadt, who took their version of "Different Drum" to No. 12 on the Cash Box Top 100, No. 13 on the Billboard Hot 100 chart, and No. 16 in Record World magazine. "Different Drum" did best in New Zealand, where it reached No. 5. In 1972, Nesmith recorded his own version. "Different Drum" has since been covered by other artists.

The Greenbriar Boys version
Michael Nesmith wrote the song in 1964, when he was looking to start performing as a singer-songwriter.  "Different Drum" tells of a pair of lovers, one of whom wants to settle down, while the other wants to retain a sense of freedom and independence. Its narrator is the lover who wants to remain free, telling the other that "we'll both live a lot longer" if they part ways now.  Nesmith said: "The lyrics ... had nothing to do with my personal life – I was newly married with a pregnant wife."

In 1965, he shared the song with John Herald of the Greenbriar Boys.   The following year, Herald's group recorded it on their album Better Late Than Never. The song reached a wider audience when Nesmith rushed through a version of it in a comedy bit while pretending to be Billy Roy Hodstetter, in the Monkees television show episode "Too Many Girls", which aired in December 1966. Davy Jones mentions this during the commentary track on some DVDs of this episode.

The Stone Poneys version
The song is best known for the 1967 version credited to the Stone Poneys, issued by  Capitol Records. featuring a vocal performance by an up-and-coming 21 year old singer named Linda Ronstadt. It was Ronstadt's first hit single, reaching No. 13 on the Billboard Hot 100 as well as No. 12 on the Cash Box magazine singles chart. (It went to No. 1 in the Los Angeles market and No. 6 in Detroit.)

Ronstadt's version flips the gender references in Nesmith's original lyrics, replacing "girl" with "boy" when describing her lover, but still referring to him being "pretty". The Stone Poneys had intended to record an "acoustic ballad version" of the song, but producer Nick Venet opted for a more complex instrumental approach, using an arrangement by Jimmy Bond (who also played bass), guitarists Al Viola and future Eagles co-founder Bernie Leadon drummer Jim Gordon, strings led by Sid Sharp, and harpsichord played in baroque style (and largely improvised during the recording) by Don Randi.  As a result, Ronstadt was the only member of the Stone Poneys who performed on the record.  The version that was released was the second take, with no overdubbing.

The album rendition offers a different stereo mix from the hit single, including a longer harpsichord bridge. Ronstadt later commented that she had been surprised and "completely confused" by the changed approach to the song, and that even years later she perceived "fear and a lack of confidence" in her performance. Nesmith, on the other hand, said that Ronstadt's performance "infused it with a new level of passion and sensuality". In later live performances of the song, Nesmith would often sing the closing verse in the same singing style as the Ronstadt version.

Michael Nesmith version
Nesmith later re-recorded "Different Drum" for his 1972 LP And the Hits Just Keep on Comin'.  His version contains four verses, as opposed to the three in Ronstadt's version.

Chart history

Weekly charts

Year-end charts

Other versions
The song has been covered by many artists:

 P.P. Arnold
 Pete Burns
 Skeeter Davis
 Tanya Donelly with The Parkington Sisters
 Flying Emus
 Frog Holler
 Susanna Hoffs (with Matthew Sweet)
 The Jayhawks
 Gina Jeffreys
 La Sera
 The Lemonheads
 The Lennon Sisters
 Me First and the Gimme Gimmes
 The Pastels
 The Poppy Family with Susan Jacks
 Victoria Shaw
 Carrie Underwood
 Sara Watkins
 Paul Westerberg
 Sarah White
 Micky Dolenz

References

External links
 
 Linda Ronstadt and The Stone Poneys live Alternate take on Different Drum

 

1965 songs
1967 singles
Linda Ronstadt songs
1990 singles
The Lemonheads songs
Matthew Sweet songs
Song recordings produced by Nick Venet
Songs written by Michael Nesmith
Baroque pop songs
Capitol Records singles